Fabienne Valérie Humm (born 20 December 1986) is a Swiss football forward, playing for FC Zürich of Switzerland's Nationalliga A. Since her debut in May 2012, a 1–0 win over Ireland, she has been a member of the Switzerland national team.

Humm was a late bloomer who did not make her national team debut until the age of 26. In contrast to most of her international teammates she decided to remain an amateur footballer. She has often played as a full-back for Switzerland, as her preferred attacking positions were taken. Humm has also represented Switzerland at beach soccer, where she became an expert at the overhead kick.

At the 2015 FIFA Women's World Cup, Humm scored the fastest hat-trick in FIFA Women's World Cup history. She struck three goals in five minutes in Switzerland's 10–1 drubbing of Ecuador.

References

External links

Profile at FC Zürich 
Fabienne Valérie Humm – FIFA World Cup profile

1986 births
Living people
Swiss women's footballers
Switzerland women's international footballers
Footballers from Zürich
Women's association football forwards
FC Zürich Frauen players
Swiss Women's Super League players
2015 FIFA Women's World Cup players
UEFA Women's Euro 2022 players
UEFA Women's Euro 2017 players
21st-century Swiss women